Pedro Fernandez Hernandez (born 11 February 1970) is a Spanish politician and a member of the Congress of Deputies for the Vox party. He represents the constituency of Zaragoza since May 2019. Hernandez has also been a councilor for Madrid City Council since June 2019.

References 

1970 births
Living people
Members of the 13th Congress of Deputies (Spain)
Members of the 14th Congress of Deputies (Spain)
Vox (political party) politicians
People from Madrid